The State of the Tenor, Vols. 1 & 2 is a live double album by the American saxophonist Joe Henderson, that was released on Blue Note records in 1986. The album features Henderson in a trio with bassist Ron Carter and drummer Al Foster, recorded live at the Village Vanguard. The recording was originally issued on two separate LPs.

Reception
Allmusic awarded the album with 4.5 stars and its review by Steve Huey states: "It is not only a fine trio outing, but a series of performances in which Henderson strips songs to their essence, turning them into his own vision." The Penguin Guide to Jazz Recordings includes the album in its suggested “core collection”.

Track listing
 "Beatrice" (Sam Rivers) – 5:48 
 "Friday the 13th" (Thelonious Monk) – 8:25
 "Happy Reunion" (Duke Ellington) – 8:39
 "Loose Change" (Ron Carter) – 7:04
 "Ask Me Now" (Monk) – 6:06
 "Isotope" (Joe Henderson) – 10:01
 "Stella by Starlight" (Victor Young, Ned Washington) – 10:18
 "Boo Boo's Birthday" (Monk) – 7:19
 "Cheryl" (Charlie Parker) – 7:41
 "Y Ya la Quiero" (Henderson) – 6:43
 "Soulville" (Horace Silver) – 5:38
 "Portrait" (Charles Mingus, Silver) – 7:05
 "The Bead Game" (Henderson, Lee Konitz) – 9:45
 "All the Things You Are" (Oscar Hammerstein II, Jerome Kern) – 9:00

Personnel
Joe Henderson – tenor saxophone  
Ron Carter – bass  
Al Foster – drums

References

Joe Henderson live albums
1986 live albums
Blue Note Records live albums
Albums recorded at the Village Vanguard